It's a Dog's Life may refer to:

It's a Dog's Life (film), a 1955 American film
"It's a Dog's Life" (Murder, She Wrote), a 1984 television episode
"It's a Dog's Life" (The Ren & Stimpy Show), a 1994 television episode
It's a Dog's Life, a 1984 Hank the Cowdog children's book by John R. Erickson
It's a Dog's Life, a video game developed by Sanctuary Woods
"It's a Dog's Life", a song by Celica Gray, closing theme of the TV series 101 Dalmatian Street
It's a Dog's Life with Bill Farmer, a Disney+ original documentary series featuring Bill Farmer, voice of Goofy and Pluto.

See also
"It's a Dog's Life and I Love It", a song from the 1991 animated film Rover Dangerfield
Dog's Life (disambiguation)